Slinfold railway station was on the Cranleigh Line and served the village of Slinfold in West Sussex.

History
The line had a single track and opened on 2 October 1865. The station had a single platform and a small goods yard facility. At one time it had three private sidings serving a brickworks (later Duke and Ockendens) and a timber yard (later Randalls Ladders).

The line was closed in 1965 following The Reshaping of British Railways report of 1963. Slinfold station was demolished and a caravan park now stands on the site. Two LBSCR houses remain on the far side of the level crossing.

Other Cranleigh Line stations
Guildford

See also
List of closed railway stations in Britain

References

External links
Slinfold railway station at Disused-Stations.org.uk
Cranleigh Line website

Disused railway stations in West Sussex
Former London, Brighton and South Coast Railway stations
Railway stations in Great Britain opened in 1865
Railway stations in Great Britain closed in 1965
Beeching closures in England
1865 establishments in England
1965 disestablishments in England